Flussmann is a surname of German and Yiddish origin ( for river). Notable people with the surname include:

Anastasia Flussmann, Austrian international table tennis player
Paul Flussmann, Austrian international table tennis player

Jewish surnames
German toponymic surnames